The CAF Awards is an awards evening held to honour the best African association football players. It is conferred by the Confederation of African Football (CAF).

Current awards
The awards include:

CAF Player of the Year

CAF Most Promising Talent of the Year

CAF Youth Player of the Year

African Inter-Club Player of the Year (Based in Africa)

CAF Coach of the Year

CAF Women's Coach of the Year

African Inter-Club Team of the Year

African National Team of the Year
The team of the year award was organized by France Football from 1980 to 2004, and by CAF from 2004 onwards.

Ranking by team

African Women's National Team of the Year
The team of the year award was organized by CAF since 2010.

CAF Legends award

CAF Female Player of the Year

African Goals of the Year

President of the Year

Federation of the Year

CAF Team of the Year

Platinum Award 

2019: Kodjovi Obilale (former Togolese goalkeeper)
2018: His Excellency Macky Sall (President of the Republic of Senegal)
2017: Nana Akufo-Addo (President of Ghana)
2017: George Weah (President-elect of Liberia and former World, Africa and European Player of the Year)
2016: Son Excellence Muhammadu Buhari (President of Nigeria)

Defunct awards

The following are no longer awarded.

CAF Goalkeeper of the Year

African Champions League Best Player
Replaced by African Inter-Club Player of the Year (Based in Africa) since 2005.

Previous winners:

CAF Referee of the Year

See also
African Footballer of the Year
FIFA World Player of the Year
Ballon d'Or
Asian Footballer of the Year
Oceania Footballer of the Year
Onze d'Or
World Soccer (magazine)

References

General

Specific

External links
CAF Online
A book of an Italian publisher about African football

 
Confederation of African Football trophies and awards
Women's association football trophies and awards